Bally Sports Florida is an American regional sports network owned by Sinclair Broadcast Group, and operates as an affiliate of Bally Sports. The channel broadcasts local sports coverage in the state of Florida, with a focus on professional sports teams based in Miami, Tampa and Orlando.

Bally Sports Florida maintains production facilities and offices located in Fort Lauderdale, alongside sister network Bally Sports Sun. The channel is available on cable television providers throughout Florida, and in parts of southern Alabama and Georgia; it is also available nationwide on satellite via DirecTV.

History

Bally Sports Florida was launched on December 29, 1987, as SportsChannel Florida. It was originally owned by Rainbow Media (a subsidiary of Cablevision Systems Corporation), and was the fourth regional network of SportsChannel America. The network originally featured coverage of local college teams, holding the broadcast rights to televise select games from the University of Florida, Florida State University, University of Miami, University of South Florida and Jacksonville University. In addition to national SportsChannel programming, the channel also showed a combined 100 baseball games that featured the New York Yankees and New York Mets from SportsChannel New York, and Chicago White Sox games broadcast by SportsChannel Chicago.

In the spring of 1988, SportsChannel Florida obtained the regional cable television rights to broadcast NBA games from the Miami Heat, effective with the 1988–89 season. In 1992, SportsChannel lost the television contract to the Heat to then-rival Sunshine Network. Heat games would return to the channel in the late 1990s when both networks came under the ownership of Fox Sports parent News Corporation.

In 1996, Florida Panthers owner Wayne Huizenga purchased a 70% controlling interest in SportsChannel Florida, with Rainbow Media (by that time, a joint venture between Cablevision and NBC) retaining a minority 30% interest. That led Huizenga to move the NHL franchise's game telecasts from Sunshine Network to SportsChannel Florida for the 1996–97 season. The following year in 1997, SportsChannel Florida obtained the rights to the Florida Marlins – also owned by Huizenga – which moved 35 games (half the schedule) from the Sunshine Network in that year's Major League Baseball season, with all games moving the following season. In 1998, SportsChannel Florida also gained the regional cable rights to the Tampa Bay Devil Rays Major League Baseball expansion team.

Unlike the other networks that were members of the SportsChannel America chain, Huizenga's control of SportsChannel Florida prevented the channel from joining Fox Sports Net. Shortly after Cablevision and Fox Sports announced the merger in 1997, Cablevision ceased production of its national SportsChannel programming in favor of Fox Sports Net's programming (though the networks would not officially rebrand until early the next year). Since SportsChannel Florida did not have rights to the Fox Sports Net programming, SportsChannel Florida made an affiliation agreement with CNN/SI to carry its programming instead. Cablevision finally repurchased Huizenga's share of the network in November 1999. The network was relaunched as Fox Sports Net Florida on March 1, 2000, making it the last SportsChannel network to adopt the Fox Sports Net brand. At this time Fox Sports Net programming was moved from the Sunshine Network (which Fox only had a minority-interest in) and CNN/SI programming was phased out.

In February 2005, News Corporation  acquired Cablevision's ownership stakes in Fox Sports Florida and Fox Sports Ohio, following an asset trade in which Fox sold its interest in Madison Square Garden and the arena's NBA and NHL team tenants, the New York Knicks and New York Rangers, to Cablevision, in exchange for acquiring sole ownership of the two Fox Sports regional networks. News Corporation spun off most of its entertainment properties into 21st Century Fox in July 2013.

On December 14, 2017, as part of a merger between both companies, The Walt Disney Company announced plans to acquire all 22 regional Fox Sports networks from 21st Century Fox, including Fox Sports Florida. However, on June 27, 2018, the Justice Department ordered their divestment under antitrust grounds, citing Disney's ownership of ESPN. On May 3, 2019, Sinclair Broadcast Group and Entertainment Studios (through their joint venture, Diamond Sports Group) bought Fox Sports Networks from The Walt Disney Company for $10.6 billion. The deal closed on August 22, 2019. On November 17, 2020, Sinclair announced an agreement with casino operator Bally's Corporation to serve as a new naming rights partner for the FSN channels. Sinclair announced the new Bally Sports branding for the channels on January 27, 2021.  On March 31, 2021, coinciding with the start of the 2021 Major League Baseball season the next day, Fox Sports Florida and sister network Fox Sports Sun rebranded as Bally Sports Florida and Bally Sports Sun, which resulted in 18 other Regional Sports Networks renamed Bally Sports in their respective regions. The first live sporting event on Bally Sports Florida will be the Marlins home opener against the Rays on April 1.

On March 14, 2023, Diamond Sports filed for Chapter 11 Bankruptcy.

Programming
Bally Sports Florida holds the regional cable television rights to the NBA's Orlando Magic, the NHL's Florida Panthers, and the Miami Marlins of Major League Baseball. It also carries coverage of college sports events from the Big East, Big 12, Conference USA and Atlantic Coast Conferences.

Bally Sports Florida shares the broadcast rights to the aforementioned professional sports teams with Bally Sports Sun (with Miami Heat games transmitted to cable providers in South Florida, and Orlando Magic games aired exclusively on Bally Sports Florida  in Central and Northern Florida. The two channels do not focus on one region of Florida, but simply distribute games in accordance with each team's territorial rights, with both cable channels maintaining exclusivity over regional broadcasts of Lightning, Heat, Marlins, Rays, Magic and Panthers games.

The Tampa Bay Lightning, Miami Heat and Tampa Bay Rays are televised on Bally Sports Sun, while the Orlando Magic, Miami Marlins and Florida Panthers are televised on Bally Sports Florida. Additionally, each network televises exclusive shoulder programming highlighting the team, players and coaches on the corresponding network.

Notable on-air staff

Current
 David Steele - Orlando Magic play-by-play announcer
 Jeff Turner - Orlando Magic color analyst
 Dante Marchitelli - Orlando Magic studio host and reporter
 Brian Hill - Orlando Magic studio analyst
 Quentin Richardson - Orlando Magic studio analyst
 Steve Goldstein - Florida Panthers play-by-play announcer
 Randy Moller - Florida Panthers color analyst
 Craig Minervini - Miami Marlins and Florida Panthers studio host and reporter
 Jessica Blaylock - Miami Marlins and Florida Panthers studio host and reporter
 Ed Jovanovski - Florida Panthers studio analyst
 Jeff Chychrun - Florida Panthers studio analyst
 Paul Severino - Miami Marlins play-by-play announcer
 Jeff Nelson - Miami Marlins studio analyst and color analyst
 Tommy Hutton - Miami Marlins studio analyst and color analyst
 Gaby Sánchez - Miami Marlins studio analyst and color analyst
 Rod Allen - Miami Marlins color analyst

Former
 Tony Grier College Basketball Commentator
 Alex Chappell - Tampa Bay Rays pre and post-game reporter now with ESPN and Mid-Atlantic Sports Network 
 Laura Rutledge - Tampa Bay Rays pre and post-game reporter now with ESPN/SEC Network 
 Allison Williams - Miami Marlins in-game reporter, Formerly of ESPN and now with Fox Sports
 Joe Magrane - Tampa Bay Rays analyst now with MLB Network
 Kevin Kennedy - Tampa Bay Rays analyst
 Kelly Nash - Tampa Bay Rays pre and post-game reporter now with MLB Network and NHL Network
 Rich Waltz - Miami Marlins Announcer formerly with MLB Network, MLB on TBS, and Los Angeles Angels baseball play-by-play announcer now with College Football and Basketball play-by-play on CBS Sports, and CBS Sports Network
 Todd Hollandsworth - Miami Marlins color analyst
 J. P. Arencibia - Miami Marlins studio analyst

Carriage conflicts

Bright House
For its first 21 years of existence, the channel was not available to most cable subscribers in the Orlando area, as Bright House Networks, the largest cable system in central Florida, refused to carry the channel. The conflict stemmed from the system's previous existence as Cablevision (a brand unaffiliated with the Bethpage, New York-based cable provider of the same name), and continued through its acquisition by Time Warner Cable and, later, Bright House. This issue did not change following Fox Sports' acquisition of Sun Sports, now known as Bally Sports Sun, which Bright House already carried on its Orlando area lineup, and continued even after the Orlando Magic moved half of the televised games in its schedule from MyNetworkTV owned-and-operated station WRBW (channel 65) to Fox Sports Florida in 2007.

Fox Sports Net's sister subsidiary Fox Television Stations had earlier purchased WRBW (then a UPN affiliate) in Orlando in 2001, followed by its purchase of Fox affiliate WOFL (channel 35) in 2002. On paper, this gave News Corporation – the corporate parent of the Fox Sports Networks at the time – the right to require Bright House to carry Fox Sports Florida as part of its retransmission consent compensation agreement for carriage of WOFL and WRBW, but Fox chose not to exercise that right. Bright House would agree to carry Fox Sports Florida on its Orlando system, with the channel being added on digital cable channel 50 on January 1, 2009. News Corporation and Bright House reached a new retransmission agreement on January 1, 2010, preventing both Fox Sports Florida and Sun Sports from being dropped from the provider's central Florida system. Fox would want Bright House to return Fox Sports Florida and Sun Sports to the provider's Orlando service area on February 12, 2010.

Fox Sports Florida was also not available on Comcast systems in the Sarasota and Tallahassee markets until 2006, and remains unavailable on Comcast's Lake County systems. Orlando Magic games aired on the channel are blacked out by Comcast in the Jacksonville market.

References

External links
 

Bally Sports
Fox Sports Networks
Sports in Florida
SportsChannel
Television channels and stations established in 1987
Companies that filed for Chapter 11 bankruptcy in 2023
1987 establishments in Florida